G. americanus may refer to:
 Gavialosuchus americanus, an extinct crocodile species
 Glugea americanus, a fungus species in the genus Glugea
 Gyrocarpus americanus, a tree species in the genus Gyrocarpus

See also
 Americanus (disambiguation)